The Royal Belgian Football Association (RBFA; ;) is the governing body of football in Belgium. It was a founding member of FIFA in 1904 and UEFA in 1954 and was based in Brussels, not far from the King Baudouin Stadium. Since October 2021, the headquarters of the RBFA are located in Tubize, next to its technical centre. Its chairman is Robert Huygens.

Teams and competitions
The Association organizes the Belgium men's, women's, youth national teams, and national eSports team for FIFA. It also runs the Belgian football league system, which includes the following competitions:
 First division A
 First division B
 National Division 1
 Division 2
 Division 3
 Provincial leagues
 Cup
 Supercup
 Futsal competitions
 Women's competitions:
 Super League
 First Division
 Second Division
 Third Division
 Cup
 From the 2012–13 through 2014–15 seasons, the federation partnered with its Dutch counterpart to operate a joint national league, the BeNe League. The two federations dissolved the joint league and reestablished their own top-level women's leagues.

Chairmen
1895–1924: Baron Edouard de Laveleye
1924–1929: Count Joseph d'Oultremont
1929–1937: Rodolphe William Seeldrayers
1937–1943: Oscar van Kesbeeck
1945–1951: Francis Dessain
1951–1967: Georges Hermesse
1967–1987: Louis Wouters
1987–2001: Baron Michel D'Hooghe
2001–2005: Jan Peeters
2006–2017: François De Keersmaecker
2017–2019: Gérard Linard
2019–2021: Mehdi Bayat
2021–present: Gilian Maertens

Association Awards
Each year, the executive committee of the Belgian FA honours deserving people with awards.

These include (highest award first):
 Grand Order of the Baron de Laveleye, as of 2015 only given to five people (including former chairmen)
 Gold Medal, for honorary members serving 10 years
 Honorary Member, to certain international referees and chairmen (typically 40 years of service)
 Emeritus Member, to certain referees and chairmen (typically 30 years of service)
 Association Medal of Honour, to certain referees and chairmen (typically 20 years of service)
 Medal of Recognition, mostly given to national football team players with 35 caps, but also to players with 20 caps whose career stopped after injury and people who have performed an exceptional service to the RBFA.

Received awards 
 In 1992, the FIFA awarded the Belgian Football Association the FIFA Fair Play Award.

Charity 
In the summer of 1986, when the national men's A-selection reached the semifinals of the World Cup in Mexico, the football team started the project Casa Hogar under impulse of RBFA delegation responsible Dr. Michel D'Hooghe. This is a home for street children in the industrial Mexican city Toluca, to which the football players donated part of their tournament bonuses. During 25 years, the RBFA stayed committed with this project and helped 500 children to meals and education.

Current sponsorships
Adidas
Carrefour
Coca-Cola
ING Group
PricewaterhouseCoopers
BMW
Proximus
ERGO
Jupiler
RTBF
Sporza
GLS
Luminus

References

External links
 
Belgium at FIFA site
Belgium at UEFA site

1895 establishments in Belgium
Association
Association
Organisations based in Belgium with royal patronage
Sports organizations established in 1895
Football
Belgium